Alisa Selezneva or Seleznyova (Russian: Алиса Селезнёва) is the main character of the series of children's science fiction books by Russian writer Kir Bulychev. The first book with Alisa Selezneva was published in 1965, and the series would go on to inspire a popular TV show, Guest from the Future. She was named one of the most recognizable faces of Soviet cinema.

Summary

The series is set in the late 21st century. In Alisa's time people learned how to travel in space faster than light. Robots and aliens are common. Time travel is possible, but reserved only for scientific purposes. The society in most of books is shown as a communist utopia: there's no need for money, environment is strictly protected and everything is done for the benefit of humans (some later books of the series contradict with this model at least regarding money).

Alisa is a teenage Russian schoolgirl with a deep interest in biology and a number of hobbies (such as violin playing, "bubble racing" etc.). Her father, Professor Seleznev, is a space biologist and director of Moscow CosmoZoo. The heroine is a curious girl, she's interested in any sort of mystery, either scientific or detective. In the stories, Alisa, her friends, and occasionally her father, travel in space and time, explore distant planets, deal with aliens, fight space pirates and make scientific discoveries.

Alisa's family is formally modelled after that of the author: he actually had a daughter named Alisa, and the heroine's parents are named after real names of Bulychev himself (Igor Vsevolodovich Mozheyko) and his wife (Kira Soshinskaya), however, according to the author, the main character shares only the name of his daughter but not her look at the similar age or her temper:

"Why have you decided that my Alisa Seleznyova is connected with my daughter Alisa? They are not even similar. [My] Alisa hasn't even read all books 'about herself', she prefers a higher class of literature."

The most famous illustrations in the books of the series were made by the graphic artist Evgeni Migunov (however, many of the earlier illustrations are by Bulychev's wife).

Selected bibliography
Only full-length novels are listed.

 Девочка, с которой ничего не случится (A Girl Nothing Can Happen To, 1965)
 Ржавый фельдмаршал (Rusty Field Marshal, 1968)
 Путешествие Алисы (Alisa's Travel, 1974)
 День рождения Алисы (Alisa's Birthday, 1974)
 Миллион приключений (Million of Adventures, 1976)
 Сто лет тому вперёд (One Hundred Years Ahead, 1978)
 Пленники астероида (Prisoners of Asteroid, 1981)
 Лиловый шар (The Lilac Ball, 1983)
 Заповедник сказок (The Reserve of Fairy Tales, 1985)
 Козлик Иван Иванович (Ivan Ivanovich the Goat, 1985)
 Гай-до (Guy-do, 1986)
 Конец Атлантиды (The End of Atlantis, 1987)
 Город без памяти (The City Without Memory, 1988)
 Подземная лодка (The Underground Boat, 1989)
 Война с лилипутами (The War Against Midgets, 1992)
 Алиса и крестоносцы (Alisa and the Crusaders, 1993)
 Излучатель доброты (The Kindness Ray, 1994)
 Дети динозавров (Dino Kids, 1995)
 Сыщик Алиса (Alisa the Detective, 1996)
 Привидений не бывает (Ghosts Don't Exist, 1996)
 Опасные сказки (Dangerous Tales, 1997)
 Планета для тиранов (A Planet for Tyrants, 1997)
 Секрет чёрного камня (Secret of the Black Stone, 1999)
 Алиса и чудовище (Alisa and a Monster, 1999)
 Звёздный пёс (The Star Dog, 2001)
 Вампир Полумракс (Twilights the Vampire, 2001)
 Алиса и Алисия (Alisa and Alisia, 2003)

TV and Film Adaptations
 The Mystery of the Third Planet (Animated film, 1981)
 Guest from the Future (Live action TV series, 1985)
 Prisoners of Yamagiri-Maru (Stop-motion animated short, 1988)
 Lilac Ball (Live action film, 1988)
 Island of Rusty General (Live action film, 1988)
 Alice's Birthday (Animated film, 2009)
 Alisa Knows What to Do! (Animated TV series, 2013)

See also

 Soviet science fiction

References

Time travelers
Fictional Russian people in literature
Literary characters introduced in 1965